David Urban (born March 6, 1964) is an American lobbyist, political operative and political commentator for CNN, and Executive Vice President for North American corporate affairs at ByteDance. He served as a senior advisor to the 2016 Donald Trump presidential campaign and helped orchestrate the 2016 Republican National Convention in a successful effort to win Pennsylvania. In May 2018, he was appointed by President Trump to the board of American Battle Monuments Commission, and in July 2018 he was elevated by Trump to be Chairman of ABMC. In August 2019, President Trump appointed Urban to the Board of Visitors of the United States Military Academy, but Urban was removed by President Biden in September of 2021 as part of the removal of Trump-appointed members of the Service Academy Visitors Boards who Biden considered unqualified for such positions. Urban advised Trump’s 2020 re-election campaign.

Early life, education, and military service
A native of Aliquippa, Beaver County, Pennsylvania, Urban was recruited to play football at Harvard University, but opted to instead attend the United States Military Academy at West Point, where he was featured in the Black Knight's 1982 media guide. An injury cut short his football career, and he graduated in 1986 with a B.S. Urban later simultaneously attended the University of Pennsylvania where he earned an M.P.A., and Temple University School of Law, where he received a J.D.

Urban served as an artillery officer in the United States Army's 101st Airborne Division, from 1986 to 1991. While serving in the Persian Gulf, he was awarded the Bronze Star Medal for meritorious achievement during combat operations in Operation Desert Storm.

Career

Early career
Urban worked with the Philadelphia-based law firm of Ballard Spahr as a public finance attorney from 1994 to 1997, when he became chief of staff to Senator Arlen Specter.

In 2002 Urban became a partner at the American Continental Group (ACG), where he now serves as President. ACG is a Washington-based lobbying firm that has worked with companies such as Comcast, Hewlett Packard Enterprise, and Raytheon. He was recognized on The Hill's "Top Lobbyists" list in 2015, 2016, 2017, and 2019.

Political career
In April 2016, Urban joined Donald Trump's presidential campaign as senior advisor. He was the deputy director of caucus operations and senior member on the ground in Cleveland for the 2016 Republican National Convention, spending over two months on that effort, and working to quell disruption by "Never Trump" delegates from the campaigns of other candidates. Urban developed a relationship of frequent cell phone contact with Trump. In November 2016, Urban helped gain the first presidential Republican win for Pennsylvania in over 28 years, and it was initially reported that he was being considered as the next chair of the Republican National Committee, or White House Deputy Chief of Staff. The potential appointment was supported by former Republican Senator Rick Santorum and former Democratic Governor Ed Rendell. It has further been reported that Urban has been considered for several positions in the Trump Administration, including Chair of the Republican National Committee, White House Deputy Chief of Staff, White House Chief of Staff, and Ambassador to Saudi Arabia.

As a political commentator for CNN, Urban has commented on matters such as the House passage of the AHCA, Trump's April 2017 National Rifle Association speech, and Trump's 100 day mark. , Urban was involved in the Pennsylvania gubernatorial campaign of businessman and fellow West Point graduate Paul Mango. It was frequently reported that Trump was considering Urban to replace Reince Priebus, and later John Kelly, as White House Chief of Staff.

In May 2018, he was appointed by President Trump to the board of the American Battle Monuments Commission, and in July 2018, was elevated by Trump to be Chairman of that Commission. In August 2019, Trump appointed Urban to the Board of Visitors of the United States Military Academy. In 2020, Urban's firm represented businesses including Walgreens and Ultimate Fighting Championship in lobbying with respect to COVID-19-related issues.

Other activities
Urban was an adjunct professor at Carnegie Mellon University's H. John Heinz III School of Public Policy and Management.  Urban is a member of the board of directors of the Museum of the American Revolution, and the Johnny Mac Soldiers Fund, and a co-owner of PoliticsPA. He serves on the Board of Directors of Virtu Financial, and FSD Pharma. In 2020, he became the Executive Vice President for North American corporate affairs at ByteDance.

References

External links

 ACG Consultants official website

1964 births
Living people
People from Aliquippa, Pennsylvania
United States Military Academy alumni
Military personnel from Pennsylvania
United States Army officers
United States Army personnel of the Gulf War
University of Pennsylvania alumni
Temple University Beasley School of Law alumni
Pennsylvania lawyers
American lobbyists
American political consultants
Donald Trump 2016 presidential campaign
People associated with the 2016 United States presidential election
CNN people